John Caryll (1625–1711), 1st Baron Caryll of Durford in the Jacobite Peerage, was a poet, dramatist, and diplomat; not to be confused with his nephew, John Caryll the younger, the dedicatee of Alexander Pope's The Rape of the Lock.

Caryll was born at West Harting in Sussex, England.  He was head of an old English Catholic and Royalist family at that time settled in West Harting, in Sussex. His father, of whom he was heir, was likewise named John; his mother was a daughter of William, second Baron Petre. Of his education he received part at the English College of St. Omer, in Artois, part at the Venerable English College in Rome. During the reign of Charles II of England he produced several plays and poems. In poetry his chief performances were a translation of Ovid's Epistle of Briseïs to Achilles, first appearing in 1680 in a work entitled Ovid's Epistles, translated by several hands, and afterwards separately; also a translation of Virgil's first Eclogue, printed in Nichol's Select Collection of Miscellany Poems and published in 1683.

His plays, both of them brought out at the Duke of York's Theatre, were a tragedy written in 1666 and called The English Princess The English Princess, or the death of Richard III (Samuel Pepys, who saw this piece acted 7 March 1667, found it no more than "pretty good"), and a comedy entitled Sir Solomon Single, or the Cautious Coxcomb, which came out in 1671, upon the pattern of Molière's The School for Wives. In 1679, during the so-called "Popish Plot", Caryll, as a Catholic of distinction, was committed to the Tower of London, but was soon let out on bail. When James II of England succeeded to the throne in 1685, he sent Caryll as his agent to the court of Pope Innocent XI, withdrawing him some months later upon the Earl of Castlemaine's appointment to that post.

Caryll was then appointed secretary to Mary of Modena, queen of James II, in whose service he continued after the Glorious Revolution of 1688, when he followed the exiled royal family across the sea to Saint-Germain. From his voluntary expatriation, however, there ensued no confiscation of his property until 1696, when, by reason of his implication in one of the plots to overthrow William of Orange (William III), he having furnished money for that purpose, his estate in West Harting was declared forfeited. His life interest in West Harting was thereon granted to Lord Cutts, but redeemed by Caryll's aforementioned nephew for £6,000. In exile at Saint-Germain, he was created by the dethroned James II (d. 1701) Baron Caryll of Durford (or Dunford) in West Sussex and appointed his Joint Secretary of State together with Charles Middleton, 2nd Earl of Middleton from 1694 to 1696.

His son, the so-called Old Pretender, James Francis Edward Stuart, recognised by Jacobites as "King James III and VIII" re-appointed him one of his Secretaries of State, a post which he continued to hold up until his death. Meanwhile, in 1700, Caryll published anonymously another work, this time in prose, entitled The Psalmes of David, translated from the Vulgat. He died 4 September 1711, and was buried at Paris in the church of the Scots College, of which he had been a benefactor and where there was set up a tablet to his memory. He married Margaret, a daughter and co-heir of Sir Maurice Drummond. She died in 1656. They left no children, and by a special remainder, he was succeeded in his Jacobite peerage, by his nephew, also named John Caryll. One of his sisters, Mary, became first abbess of the English Benedictine nuns in Dunkirk. A grandson of the above-mentioned nephew  served as Secretary to Charles Edward Stuart, called "the Young Pretender", known by Jacobites as "King Charles III"; after his death his younger son moved to the USA and settled in Chicago.

The Baron of Caryll of Durford (or Dunford) descendants live today in the USA. Since the family moved to the USA, they dropped one of "L" in their last name and became Caryl.  Theodor and Christian Caryl  are direct descendants of the lord John Caryll. Christian Caryl lives in Washington, DC; he is married and has two kids - son Timothy and daughter Alexandra Caryl. Christian Caryl is a famous journalist and writer, working in more than 56 countries and speaking 6 languages fluently.

References

1625 births
1711 deaths
People educated at Stonyhurst College
Earls in the Jacobite peerage
English College, Rome alumni
English dramatists and playwrights
English Jacobites
English male dramatists and playwrights
English male poets
People from Chichester District